Major-General Sir Arthur Robert Ford Dorward,  (13 July 1848 – 25 March 1934) was a British Army officer who commanded the Troops in the Straits Settlements and served as the first Commissioner of British Weihaiwei.

Early life and education
Dorward was born in Ootacamund, British India, the son of James Dorward of Pencaitland, Inspector-General of Hospitals, Madras, and his wife, Charlotte Matilda Ford. He was educated at Edinburgh High School and at Cheltenham College before attending the Royal Military College, Sandhurst.

Military career
Dorward was commissioned into the Royal Engineers in 1868. He served in the Second Anglo-Afghan War in 1878. He was appointed Commander, Royal Engineers in Jamaica in 1897 and then took part in the capture of Tientsin following the Boxer Rebellion in China in 1900, for which he was knighted as a Knight Commander of the Order of the Bath (KCB). Dorward then served as Commissioner of Weihaiwei from September 1901, and went on to be Commander of the troops in Shanghai later the same year. In October 1902 it was announced he would vacate his command in Shanghai as the British reduced their forces in China, and he returned home where he was received by King Edward VII and invested with the KCB at Buckingham Palace on 24 October 1902.

He was subsequently appointed General Officer Commanding the Troops in the Straits Settlements with the rank of brigadier-general on 13 November 1902, and left the UK for Singapore the same month, taking up the post on arrival in 1903. Two years later he was appointed Major-General in charge of Administration in South Africa in 1905. He served in World War I as Inspector of Hutting at the War Office.

He died in Palma, Majorca.

References

1848 births
1934 deaths
Graduates of the Royal Military College, Sandhurst
British Army generals of World War I
Knights Commander of the Order of the Bath
Companions of the Distinguished Service Order
Royal Engineers officers
People educated at Cheltenham College
British military personnel of the Second Anglo-Afghan War
British Army personnel of the Boxer Rebellion
Military personnel of British India
British Army major generals